Cusin is a surname. Notable people with the surname include:

Alphonse Cusin (1820–1894), French architect
Marco Cusin (born 1985), Italian basketball player
Rémi Cusin (born 1986), French cyclist
Stefano Cusin (born 1968), Canadian-born Italian footballer and manager